Gerry Ellis (born November 12, 1957) is a former professional American football player who played running back for seven seasons for the Green Bay Packers. He played college football at Missouri and was drafted by the Los Angeles Rams in the 1980 NFL Draft. He was inducted into the Green Bay Packers Hall of Fame in 1994.

College career
After playing high school football at Hickman High School in Columbia, Missouri, Ellis spent his first year post-high school at Fort Scott Junior College. He later played at Missouri, where he started at fullback but was injured midway through his senior year. He returned in time for the 1979 Hall of Fame Bowl against South Carolina, where he scored a touchdown.

Professional career
Ellis was drafted by the Los Angeles Rams in the seventh round 1980 NFL Draft, but was cut by the team in his first preseason and was claimed by the Green Bay Packers in free agency during the opening stages of the 1980 season. After rising to starting fullback in the middle of September 1980, Ellis scored his first career NFL touchdown against the Rams. He set Packers single-season team records for total offense by a running back and receiving yards by a running back in 1981, accumulating more than a quarter of Green Bay's total offensive yards. On September 30, 1984, Ellis caught a lateral from James Lofton as time expired against the Tampa Bay Buccaneers, scoring a touchdown and sending the game into overtime. The Packers unfortunately lost the game in overtime. After playing at fullback from 1980 to 1983, Ellis moved to running back before 1984. He led the Packers in rushing in both 1983 and 1984, and returned kicks for the Packers in 1985.

Before the 1987 season, Ellis was volunteering at a football camp for underserved youth and tore his Achilles tendon while working out, never to step on an NFL field again. 

Ellis was inducted into the Green Bay Packers Hall of Fame in 1994.

Personal life
Ellis grew up in Columbia, Missouri with eight siblings, where he competed in track and field and set Central Missouri Conference records in discus and shot put. While attending college at the University of Missouri, Ellis majored in education. He invested in real estate as a side job during his football career.

References

1957 births
Living people
Sportspeople from Columbia, Missouri
Players of American football from Missouri
American football fullbacks
Hickman High School alumni
Missouri Tigers football players
Green Bay Packers players